In the City is the third studio album by American soul/R&B group Tavares, released in 1975 on the Capitol label.

Commercial performance
The album peaked at No. 8 on the R&B albums chart. It also reached No. 26 on the Billboard 200. The album features the singles "It Only Takes a Minute", which peaked at No. 1 on the Hot Soul Singles chart and No. 10 on the Billboard Hot 100, The Edgar Winter Group's "Free Ride", which charted at No. 8 on the Hot Soul Singles chart and No. 52 on the Billboard Hot 100, and "The Love I Never Had", which reached No. 11 on the Hot Soul Singles chart.

Track listing

Charts
Album

Singles

References

External links

1975 albums
Tavares (group) albums
albums arranged by Michael Omartian
Capitol Records albums